Vulva is the English experimental techno duo of Tim Hutton and the German-born Thomas Melchior.

Hutton and Melchior formed Vulva in 1993, and were signed by Aphex Twin's Rephlex Records. Their first release was From the Cockpit in 1993. The Mini Space Vulvette EP was released in 1994 by the US label Reflective Records. They also recorded as Yoni for German label Source. Their second album, Birdwatch, was released by Rephlex in 1995, and they followed it with Vulvic Yonification in 1997.

Melchior went on to release records under a variety of pseudonyms. Hutton, who had previously released a solo album (Conscious Kind, released in 1991 by Some Bizzare), recorded another, Everything, released in 2000 by Play It Again Sam.

Discography
From the Cockpit (1993), Rephlex
Mini Space Vulvette EP (1994), Reflective
Birdwatch (1995), Rephlex
My Little Yoni (1996), Source -as Yoni
"Doggy Bag" single (1996), Soft Core
Vulvic Yonification (1997), EFA

References

External links
Vulva at Rephlex Records
Vulva at DiscoGs

English techno musicians